Paul Martin (born 14 June 1967) is an Australian former rugby league footballer who played in the 1980s and 1990s for the Canberra Raiders and the Gold Coast.

Playing career
While attending Stirling College ACT, Martin played for the Australian Schoolboys rugby league team in 1984 and 1985.

In the 1989 NSWRL season's grand final Martin played for the Canberra Raiders from the interchange bench in the win against the Balmain Tigers. In the post season he travelled with the Raiders to England for the 1989 World Club Challenge which was lost to Widnes.

Martin started on the wing for the Raiders grand finals matches against the Penrith Panthers in 1990 and 1991. Martin was the top tryscorer for the Raiders in 1991 with 14.

Martin played out his career with the Gold Coast.

References

1967 births
Living people
Australian rugby league players
Canberra Raiders players
Country New South Wales Origin rugby league team players
Gold Coast Chargers players
Rugby league wingers